Anokha Daan is a 1972 Hindi film directed by Asit Sen. The film starred Anil Dhawan, Rakesh Pandey, Kabir Bedi, Archana and Zaheera.

Cast
 Archana
 Kabir Bedi
 Tarun Bose
 Anil Dhawan
 Mukri
 Nadira
 Rakesh Pandey
 Zaheera

Music
The music of the film was composed by Salil Chowdhury, while lyrics were penned by Yogesh and contains songs such as:
 "Hame Yaad Kahin You Kar Leta" (Lata Mangeshkar)
 "Madhbhari Yeh Hawaein" (Lata Mangeshkar)
 "Hamrahi Manzil Ke" (Kishore Kumar)
 "Mana Ki Hai Zindagi" (Lata Mangeshkar)
 "Aayen Ghir Ghir Saavan Ki Kali Kali Ghatayen" (Kishore Kumar)

References

External links 
 
 

1972 films
1970s Hindi-language films
Indian drama films
Films scored by Salil Chowdhury
1972 drama films
Hindi-language drama films